Lucien Goethals (26 June 1931 – 12 December 2006) was a Belgian composer.

Life
Lucien Goethals was born in Ghent, but spent his formative years in Argentina, where he studied at the Dima Conservatory of Buenos Aires. When he returned to Belgium, he continued his studies at the Royal Conservatory in Ghent up to 1956, where he earned his first prize in organ, music history, counterpoint, and fugue. He later studied orchestration with Norbert Rosseau, and serial technique and electronic composition with Gottfried Michael Koenig and De Meester. He worked at the IPEM in Ghent ever since it was founded in 1962, and was its artistic director from 1970 to 1987. He died in Ghent, aged 75.

Aesthetics
Goethals was a stubborn proponent of "high" culture, in opposition to postmodernism thinking, which wants to dissolve the separation between "high" and "low" culture into the function of a global post-industrial culture of consumption.

Compositions
Musica Dodecafonica, for piano (1959)
Twee Kristallen, for piano (1961)
Studies I–VIIb, for tape (1962–73)
Diálogos, for wind quintet, percussion, 2 string quintets, string orchestra, and 4-track tape (1963) 
Endomorfie I, for violin, piano, and tape (1964)
Endomorfie II, for 8 winds (1964)
Cellotape, for cello with contact microphone, piano, and tape (1965)
Lecina (6 songs, text: J. Van der Hoeven), for mezzo-soprano, flute, violin, and cello (1966)
Sinfonía en gris mayor, 2 orchestras, percussion, 2 tapes (1966) 
Contrapuntos, for 1–12 tapes (1967)
Mouvement (String Quartet No. 1) (1967)
Vensters (text: J. Van der Hoeven), mobile for 2 speakers, cello, piano, percussion, 4 film projectors, and 4 tapes (1967)
Cáscaras (text: C. Rodriguez), cantata for mezzo-soprano and 5 instruments (1969)
Hé! [collaborative work with Karel Goeyvaerts and Herman Sabbe] (text: Herman Sabbe), for mime, 10 instruments, tapes, and slide projector (1971) 
Concerto for Orchestra (1972) 
Llanto por Salvador Allende, for trombone (1973)
Melioribus, for tape (1973)
Tres paisajes sonores, for flute, oboe, horn, trombone, violin, double bass, and harpsichord (1973)
Diferencias, for 10 winds (1974)
Polyfonium, for tape (1975)
Four Pieces for Orchestra (1976)
Pluriversum, for tape (1977)
Música con cantus firmus triste, for flute and string trio (1978)
Pampa (R. Güiraldes), mezzo-soprano, flute, clarinet, violin, viola, cello, piano, and percussion (1979)
Polyfonium II, for tape (1980)
Concerto for bass clarinet, contrabass clarinet, and orchestra (1983) 
Concierto de la luz y las tinieblas, for organ and orchestra (1990)
Synthèse '92, for tape (1991)
String Quartet No. 2 (1992)

Bibliography

Footnotes

External links
Goethals biography on CeBeDeM website.
Website of the Stichting Lucien Goethals on IPEM 
 Koninklijk Conservatorium Brussel now houses most works and manuscripts of Goethals, after the bankruptcy of CeBeDeM in 2015.

1931 births
2006 deaths
20th-century classical composers
21st-century classical composers
Twelve-tone and serial composers
Belgian classical composers
Belgian male classical composers
Electroacoustic music composers
20th-century Belgian male musicians
21st-century male musicians